Pavel Eismann (born 20 August 1984) is a former Czech footballer who lastly played for FC Zbrojovka Brno.

References

Notes
 
 

Czech footballers
Czech First League players
1. FK Příbram players
FK Viktoria Žižkov players
FC Zbrojovka Brno players
1. FC Slovácko players
Sandecja Nowy Sącz players
1984 births
Living people
Czech expatriate footballers
Czech expatriate sportspeople in Poland
Expatriate footballers in Poland
Association football midfielders
People from Chrudim
MFK Karviná players
FK Fotbal Třinec players
Bohemians 1905 players
FK Pardubice players
Czech National Football League players
Sportspeople from the Pardubice Region